Great South was a centre-right regionalist political party in Italy.

History
In January 2012 GS formed a sub-group in the Mixed Group of the Chamber of Deputies, including the seven FdS deputies (Giuseppe Fallica, Ugo Grimaldi, Maurizio Iapicca, Gianfranco Micciché, Antonino Minardo, Francesco Stagno D'Alcontres and Giacomo Terranova) and two new entries (Aurelio Misiti, from Italy of Values, who was appointed chairman, and Gerardo Soglia, from the PdL), but not the three deputies of NS. In March 2012 the party was joined by Giancarlo Pittelli.

In the 2012 Sicilian regional election Micciché ran for president, as part of a "Sicilianist" coalition including also the Party of the Sicilians, the Sicilian People's Movement and the local wing of Future and Freedom. Micciché won 15.4% of the vote and GS obtained a mere 6.0%, returning five regional deputies.

In the 2013 general election, Great South was part of the centre-right coalition and obtained the 0.43% of the vote for the Chamber and the 0.39% of the vote for the Senate, electing a senator in Calabria and two senators in the PdL's list in Sicily.

In 2013 Great South joined the new Forza Italia and became virtually inactive as an independent party.

Composition
Great South was initially composed of the following parties:

References
Notes

External links
 Website

2011 establishments in Italy
2013 disestablishments in Italy
Defunct political parties in Italy
Political parties established in 2011
Political parties disestablished in 2013
Regionalist parties in Italy